Jesse Cox may refer to:

Jesse Cox (activist), chair of the National Executive Board of the Social Democratic Party of America in the late 1890s
Jesse Cox (YouTuber), American internet personality
Jesse Cox (broadcaster), Australian radio broadcaster